The Phillips baronetcy, of Tylney Hall, is a title in the Baronetage of the United Kingdom. It was created for Lionel Phillips on 10 February 1912.

Phillips baronets of Tylney Hall (1912)
Sir Lionel Phillips, 1st Baronet (6 August 1855 – 2 July 1936)
Sir Lionel Francis Phillips, 2nd Baronet (9 March 1914 – 6 July 1944)
Sir Robin Francis Phillips, 3rd Baronet (born 29 July 1940)

See also
Phelipps baronets
Philipps baronets
Philips baronets
Philipson-Stow baronets
Phillipps baronets

References

Baronetcies in the Baronetage of the United Kingdom